Bad Golf Made Easier is a 1993 33-minute video by actor Leslie Nielsen. It is a parody of golf and other golf videos and books. It demonstrates many humorous bad golf swings, and a slogan found in it is: "I don't play golf to feel bad; I play bad golf but feel good!" In the video, many people hit the dirt out from the ground, drop their golf clubs into the water, and make other mistakes.

Cast
Leslie Nielsen as Barry
Archie Hahn as Billy
Sonny Bono as himself

Sequels
Two sequels, Bad Golf My Way and Stupid Little Golf Video, were released in 1994 and 1997. In keeping with the theme of the first video, Nielsen demonstrated additional golf strategies in a comical format. , Stupid Little Golf Video is the only one of the trio that has been released on DVD.

External links 
 
 
 Review from Rottentomatoes.com

1993 comedy films
1990s parody films
1993 films
American comedy films
Direct-to-video comedy films
1990s English-language films
Golf films
Films directed by Rick Friedberg
1990s American films